Bringin' Home the Bacon is a 1924 American silent Western film directed by Richard Thorpe and starring Jay Wilsey, Jean Arthur and Bert Lindley.

Cast
 Jay Wilsey as Bill Winton 
 Jean Arthur as Nancy Norton
 Bert Lindley as Joe Breed
 Lafe McKee as Judge Simpson
 George F. Marion as Noel Simms
 Wilbur McGaugh as Jim Allen
 Victor King as Rastus
 Laura Miskin as Bertha Abernathy
 Frank Ellis as The Bandit

References

External links
 

1924 films
1924 Western (genre) films
1920s English-language films
American black-and-white films
Films directed by Richard Thorpe
Silent American Western (genre) films
1920s American films